The 2018 Dubai Tennis Championships (also known as the Dubai Duty Free Tennis Championships for sponsorship reasons) was an ATP 500 event on the 2018 ATP World Tour and a WTA Premier event on the 2018 WTA Tour. Both events were held at the Aviation Club Tennis Centre in Dubai, United Arab Emirates. The women's tournament took place from February 19 to 25, while the men's tournament took place from February 26 through March 3.

Points and prize money

Point distribution

Prize money

*per team

ATP singles main-draw entrants

Seeds 

 Rankings are as of February 19, 2018.

Other entrants 
The following players received wildcards into the singles main draw:
  Marcos Baghdatis
  Malek Jaziri
  Stefanos Tsitsipas

The following player received entry as a special exempt:
  Ilya Ivashka

The following players received entry using a protected ranking:
  Andreas Haider-Maurer
  Yoshihito Nishioka

The following players received entry from the qualifying draw:
  Ernests Gulbis 
  Quentin Halys
  Yannick Maden 
  Gleb Sakharov

The following player received entry as a lucky loser:
  Blaž Kavčič

Withdrawals 
Before the tournament
  Paolo Lorenzi → replaced by  Blaž Kavčič

ATP doubles main-draw entrants

Seeds 

 Rankings are as of February 19, 2018.

Other entrants
The following pairs received wildcards into the doubles main draw:
  James Cerretani  /  Leander Paes 
  Denis Istomin /  Daniel Nestor

The following pair received entry from the qualifying draw:
  Jan-Lennard Struff /  Viktor Troicki

The following pair received entry as lucky losers:
  Andreas Haider-Maurer /  Florian Mayer

Withdrawals
Before the tournament
  Karen Khachanov

WTA singles main-draw entrants

Seeds 

 Rankings are as of February 12, 2018.

Other entrants
The following players received wildcards into the singles main draw:
  Catherine Bellis
  Johanna Konta
  Naomi Osaka 
  Jeļena Ostapenko

The following players received entry from the qualifying draw:
  Sara Errani
  Samantha Stosur
  Lesia Tsurenko
  Sofya Zhuk

The following player received entry as a lucky loser:
  Wang Qiang

Withdrawals
  Ashleigh Barty → replaced by  Ekaterina Makarova
  Julia Görges → replaced by  Carla Suárez Navarro
  Madison Keys → replaced by  Elise Mertens
  Petra Kvitová → replaced by  Wang Qiang
  Mirjana Lučić-Baroni → replaced by  Anett Kontaveit

WTA doubles main-draw entrants

Seeds 

 Rankings are as of February 12, 2018.

Other entrants
The following pair received a wildcard into the doubles main draw:
  Lisa Ponomar /  Eden Silva

Withdrawals
During the tournament
  Lucie Šafářová

Champions

Men's singles

  Roberto Bautista Agut def.  Lucas Pouille, 6–3, 6–4

Women's singles

  Elina Svitolina  def.  Daria Kasatkina, 6–4, 6–0

Men's doubles

  Jean-Julien Rojer /  Horia Tecău def.  James Cerretani /  Leander Paes, 6–2, 7–6(7–2)

Women's doubles

  Chan Hao-ching /  Yang Zhaoxuan def.  Hsieh Su-wei /  Peng Shuai, 4–6, 6–2, [10–6]

References

External links
 Official website

 
2018